The Port of Dar es Salaam is the principal port serving Tanzania. The port is one of three ocean ports in the country and handles over 90% of the country's cargo traffic. According to the International Association of Ports and Harbors, it is the fourth largest port on the African continent's Indian Ocean coastline after Durban, Mombasa and Maputo. The port acts as a gateway for commerce and trade for Tanzania and numerous bordering landlocked states.

History

Colonial period

The city owes its existence to the port at Dar es Salaam. The city began its development in 1862 by the Sultan of Zanzibar Majid bin Said as an alternative port to the ports of Bagamoyo and Zanzibar; however, after his death the project was scrapped. It was not resumed until the German East Africa Company began to rebuild the city in 1887. The Germans had already completed the Usambara Railway from the Port of Tanga and began constructing the new Tanzanian Central Line from their new capital to the port of Dar es Salaam.

After World War I the British took over Tanganyika and maintained their capital in the city. Economic activity continued through the early 20th century and through World War II, centralised around the city and this facilitated expansion of the port. After Tanganyika gained its independence the city retained its position as the commercial capital.

Apartheid South Africa
Due to the Apartheid South Africa government many land-locked Southern African countries such as Zambia, Zimbabwe and Malawi that had relied on South African ports turned to the Port of Dar es Salaam. This facilitated the construction of the TAZARA Railway, TANZAM highway and the Malawi corridor link. The port provides a gateway for Zambian copper exports and Malawian tobacco exports, furthermore it provides a vital lifeline for fuel imports.

Present operations

With the continually growing economies in the region the reliance of dar port increased drastically. The port saw an average of 10% annual growth of cargo traffic from 2003 onwards which complemented the rapid growth of the city of Dar es Salaam.

The port has faced increased criticism of inefficiencies and corruption and has seen increased international pressure.

Expansion
The port is currently being expanded at the cost of $421m. The number of vehicles will rise by 268 percent upon completion of the port.

In July 2020, a foundation stone was laid for the construction of an inland port in Tanzania at the cost of $20m.
The construction will include building a 150m berth, which is all set for completion in 24 months. As of July 2020, 80 percent of the construction has been completed.

Foreign cargo centers

35% of cargo moving through the port is foreign owned and Dar es Salaam port facilitates countries that rely heavily on Dar es salaam port and gives them licenses to operate their own cargo centers. The foreign cargo centers help countries to process cargo from their respective countries to increase efficiency and reduce costs.

MOFED Tanzania Limited
MOFED Tanzania limited is a Zambian-owned clearing and forwarding company. MOFED stands for the Ministry of Finance and Economic Development which in April 2001 replaced the defunct zamcargo. The company is an entirely Zambian government owned organization and deals with the majority of Zambian Exports and Imports. MOFED operates out of the Mukuba Depot, located in south Kurasini and has direct access to the TAZARA rail link.

Malawi Cargo Center Limited
The Malawi Cargo Center was set up by the Government of Malawi in the early 1990s due to the closure of Beira and Nacala ports following the Mozambique Civil war. The company has dedicated warehouses and operates dry ports in Dar es Salaam and Mbeya. The MCCL's main revenue earner/cargo is fuel bound for Malawi. Fuel and goods are loaded onto wagons on the TAZARA bound for Mbeya and then trucked into Malawi through the Kyela Border.

Awards
Dar Port has been voted the best port in the 27th edition of the World Travel Awards in Africa.

References

External links

 Opening the Gates: How the port of Dar es Salaam Can Transform Tanzania

Dar
Transport in Dar es Salaam
Buildings and structures in Dar es Salaam
Economy of Dar es Salaam